Raymond "Rony" Araiji (in Arabic ريمون "روني" عريجي) (born in Zgharta, Lebanon on 31 July 1965) is a Lebanese politician, lawyer and government minister.

Education and career
He received a bachelor's degree in law from the Saint Joseph University (USJ), Beirut in 1988 and a post graduate studies diploma in private law in 1989 from the same university.

In 1990, he joined the Beirut Bar Association as a lawyer, and then continued to practice his legal profession at his private office. 
  
He is a founding member of the Marada Movement and previously a consultant to Suleiman Tony Frangieh. He was foreign relations coordinator for the Marada Movement political bureau.

On 15 February 2014, he was named as the minister of culture in the cabinet of Lebanese Prime Minister Tammam Salam. His tenure ended in 2016.

Private life 
He is married to Wadad Abdullah and has two daughters.

References

External links
Raymond Araygi on Ehden Family Tree website
Homepage of law office

Living people
Culture ministers of Lebanon
People from Zgharta
Free Patriotic Movement politicians
Marada Movement politicians
Lebanese Maronites
1965 births
Saint Joseph University alumni